Oreophryne notata is a species of frog in the family Microhylidae. It is endemic to Papua New Guinea and known from two localities, Ialibu, its type locality in the Southern Highlands Province, and Tabubil in the Western Province. It might occur more widely. The specific name notata is from Latin nota meaning a "mark" or "letter" and refers to the  diagnostic U-like pattern on the lores.

Description
The snout is almost truncate in dorsal view but vertical, slightly
rounded in profile. The tympanum is small and indistinct, but the eyes are comparatively large. The fingers and toes have no webbing but bear well-developed
terminal disks. The dorsum has gray-brown or tan ground color and shows only faint markings. The facial region is slightly darker than the dorsal ground color and has a characteristic, inverted U-shaped white mark just anterior to the eye. The hind legs have a reddish tint. The ventral surfaces are pale translucent gray with lighter flecks.

The male advertisement call is a series of peeping notes with dominant frequency of 3500–3600 Hz. Development is presumably direct, without free-living tadpole stage, as in other members of this genus.

Habitat and conservation
They occur on vegetation above the ground, in shrubs and trees such as Pandanus. Males call at night. The threats to this little known species are not known. It is not known to occur in any protected area.

References

notata
Amphibians of Papua New Guinea
Endemic fauna of Papua New Guinea
Taxa named by Richard G. Zweifel
Amphibians described in 2003
Taxonomy articles created by Polbot